The UK Singles Chart is one of many music charts compiled by the Official Charts Company that calculates the best-selling singles of the week in the United Kingdom. Before 2004, the chart was only based on the sales of physical singles. This list shows singles that peaked in the Top 10 of the UK Singles Chart during 1970, as well as singles which peaked in 1969 and 1971 but were in the top 10 in 1970. The entry date is when the single appeared in the top 10 for the first time (week ending, as published by the Official Charts Company, which is six days after the chart is announced).

One-hundred and twenty-two singles were in the top ten in 1970. Eleven singles from 1969 remained in the top 10 for several weeks at the beginning of the year, while "Grandad" by Clive Dunn, "I'll Be There" by The Jackson 5 and "Ride a White Swan" by T. Rex were all released in 1970 but did not reach their peak until 1971. "All I Have to Do Is Dream" by Bobbie Gentry and Glen Campbell, "Melting Pot" by Blue Mink, "Suspicious Minds" by Elvis Presley and "Tracy" by The Cuff Links were the singles from 1969 to reach their peak in 1970. Nineteen artists scored multiple entries in the top 10 in 1970. Chicago, Deep Purple, Hot Chocolate, The Jackson 5 and Neil Diamond were among the many artists who achieved their first UK charting top 10 single in 1970.

The 1969 Christmas number-one, "Two Little Boys" by Rolf Harris, remained at number-one for the first four weeks of 1970. The first new number-one single of the year was "Love Grows (Where My Rosemary Goes)" by Edison Lighthouse. Overall, fourteen different singles peaked at number-one in 1970, with fourteen unique artists having singles hit that position.

Background

Multiple entries
One-hundred and twenty-two singles charted in the top 10 in 1970, with one-hundred and twelve singles reaching their peak this year.

Nineteen artists scored multiple entries in the top 10 in 1970. Elvis Presley and The Jackson 5 shared the record for most top 10 hits in 1970 with four hit singles each.

Christie was one of a number of artists with two top-ten entries, including the number-one single "Yellow River". Andy Williams, The Dave Clark Five, Gerry Monroe, Marmalade and Stevie Wonder were among the other artists who had multiple top 10 entries in 1970.

Chart debuts
Fifty-one artists achieved their first top 10 single in 1970, either as a lead or featured artist. Of these, five went on to record another hit single that year: Chairmen of the Board, Chicago, Christie, Gerry Monroe and White Plains. The Jackson 5 had three other entries in their breakthrough year.

The following table (collapsed on desktop site) does not include acts who had previously charted as part of a group and secured their first top 10 solo single.

Notes
Yoko Ono and John Lennon both made their first appearances in the chart where they are given individual credit, both having appeared under the guise of Plastic Ono Band, the latter as a member of The Beatles. Plastic Ono band debuted in 1969 with "Give Peace a Chance".

Fair Weather was set up by Andy Fairweather Low, formerly of the newly disbanded group Amen Corner, who had four top 10 singles between 1966 and 1969, including number-one "(If Paradise Is) Half as Nice". Dave Edmunds had been part of Love Sculpture's line-up in the late 1960s, "Sabre Dance" becoming a surprise hit. "I Hear You Knocking", his debut solo single, was 1970's Christmas number-one.

Songs from films
Original songs from various films entered the top 10 throughout the year. These included "Come and Get It" (from The Magic Christian) and "Raindrops Keep Fallin' on My Head" (Butch Cassidy and the Sundance Kid).

Best-selling singles
Mungo Jerry had the best-selling single of the year with "In the Summertime". The single spent eleven weeks in the top 10 (including seven weeks at number one). "The Wonder of You" by Elvis Presley came in second place. Freda Payne's "Band of Gold", "Spirit in the Sky" from Norman Greenbaum and "Bridge over Troubled Water" by Simon & Garfunkel made up the top five. Singles by the England World Cup Squad 1970, Free, Lee Marvin, Christie and Smokey Robinson and The Miracles were also in the top ten best-selling singles of the year.

Top-ten singles
Key

Entries by artist

The following table shows artists who achieved two or more top 10 entries in 1970, including singles that reached their peak in 1969 or 1971. The figures include both main artists and featured artists, while appearances on ensemble charity records are also counted for each artist. The total number of weeks an artist spent in the top ten in 1970 is also shown.

Notes

 "I'll Be There" reached its peak of number four on 23 January 1971 (week ending).
 "Ride a White Swan" reached its peak of number two on 23 January 1971 (week ending).
 "Grandad" reached its peak of number-one on 9 January 1971 (week ending).
 "The Liquidator" re-entered the top 10 at number 10 on 10 January 1970 (week ending).
 "Knock, Knock Who's There?" was the United Kingdom's entry at the Eurovision Song Contest in 1970.
 "All Kinds of Everything" was Ireland's winning entry at the Eurovision Song Contest in 1970.
 "Back Home" was recorded by the England football team as the official single supporting their 1970 FIFA World Cup campaign.
 "Love of the Common People" re-entered the top 10 at number 9 on 25 July 1970 (week ending).
 "The Wonder of You" is listed as the best-selling single of the year by some sources, but the Official Charts Company gives the title to "In the Summertime" (sales cut-off date 19 December 1970).
 "Love Is Life" re-entered the top 10 at number 10 on 3 October 1970 (week ending).
 "Montego Bay" re-entered the top 10 at number 8 on 31 October 1970 (week ending).
 "It's Wonderful (To Be Loved by You)" re-entered the top 10 at number 10 on 5 December 1970 (week ending).
 "Cracklin' Rosie" re-entered the top 10 at number 10 on 30 January 1971 (week ending).
 "Ride a White Swan" re-entered the top 10 at number 10 on 2 January 1971 (week ending) for 6 weeks.
 Figure includes single that first charted in 1969 but reached its peak in 1970.
 Figure includes single that peaked in 1971.
 Figure includes single that peaked in 1969.
 Figure includes one top 10 hit with the group The Beatles.

See also
1970 in British music
List of number-one singles from the 1970s (UK)

References
General

Specific

External links
1970 singles chart archive at the Official Charts Company (click on relevant week)

United Kingdom
Top 10 singles
1970